Yosvane  Despaigne Terry (born April 13, 1976 in Cienfuegos) is a male judoka from Cuba, who twice won the bronze medal in the men's middleweight division (– 90 kg) at the Pan American Games (1999 and 2003).

He represented his native country at three consecutive Summer Olympics, starting in 1996 in Atlanta, Georgia. His younger brother Oreidis Despaigne was also competing as a judoka on the international level.

References
sports-reference

1976 births
Living people
Judoka at the 1996 Summer Olympics
Judoka at the 2000 Summer Olympics
Judoka at the 2004 Summer Olympics
Judoka at the 1999 Pan American Games
Judoka at the 2003 Pan American Games
Olympic judoka of Cuba
Cuban male judoka
Pan American Games bronze medalists for Cuba
Pan American Games medalists in judo
Universiade medalists in judo
Universiade bronze medalists for Cuba
Medalists at the 1999 Summer Universiade
Medalists at the 1999 Pan American Games
Medalists at the 2003 Pan American Games
People from Cienfuegos
20th-century Cuban people
21st-century Cuban people